Children of God is the second book, and the second science fiction novel, written by author Mary Doria Russell. It is the sequel to the novel The Sparrow.

Plot summary 
Father Emilio Sandoz is a Jesuit priest who has returned to Earth and is recovering from his experiences on the planet Rakhat (detailed in The Sparrow). He is exposed to Father General Vincenzo Giuliani's organized crime "family", the Camorra. At a christening celebration, he meets Celestina, aged four, and her mother Gina, a divorcee with whom Emilio begins to fall in love. Emilio is released from the priesthood. He trains the second Jesuit expedition to Rakhat, composed of Sean Fein, Danny Iron Horse, Joseba Urizarbarrena, and John Candotti, in the K'San (Jana'ata) and Ruanja (Runa) languages. Sandoz refuses to go. Gina is about to go on vacation, after which Emilio plans to marry her.

Unfortunately, while Gina is on vacation, Emilio is beaten and kidnapped by Carlo, Gina's ex-husband and Celestina's father. Emilio is kept in a constantly drugged state on Carlo's ship, the Giordano Bruno. They are actually working for the Jesuits and the Vatican, who want Sandoz to return to Rakhat. It is extremely important that the Jesuits put right (as much as possible) what they destroyed on Rakhat; the massacre of the first landing party and the violent revolution of the Runa serving class that followed, have caused a rift between the Society of Jesus and the rest of the Catholic Church. In fact, the Jesuit order has all but vanished.

Back on Rakhat, there is an unexpected survivor of the massacre; Sofia Mendes Quinn, grievously injured but her pregnancy intact, has been hidden from the Jana'ata patrols at a concealed village called Trucha Sai ("forget us"). She commands Runa troops in the revolution and is their Joan of Arc figure. She has been sending packets of information back to the initial Earth voyage's asteroid ship Stella Maris, still in orbit around Rakhat, as was the normal practice of the original landing party. She has her baby with help from the locals. Soon, it is apparent that her son, Isaac, is autistic. He is most comfortable alone in natural environments, and she educates him via her computer tablet. Sometime later, the signal from the Stella Maris becomes inactive, but Sofia does not guess that it is because other Earthmen — the United Nations Contact Consortium — came to Rakhat and sent the ship home, let alone that Emilio Sandoz had been rescued and was aboard, headed back for the lengthy inquisition covered in The Sparrow.

Up in Inbrokar's ornate capital city Galatna, Hlavin Kitheri, the Jana'ata Reshtar (third-born prince), has fulfilled his promise to ambitious tradesman Supaari. When Supaari gave Emilio to Hlavin as a gift, Hlavin arranged a marriage between Supaari and his sister, Jholaa. Having lived all her life in strict purdah and enforced ignorance, she is not even told of their plans until the wedding is actually occurring. The ceremony includes consummation in front of everyone — actually rape in this case, because Jholaa was unprepared for marriage and did not desire Supaari. She detests him, and when she has a daughter, Supaari is told that the infant is deformed, and by tradition he must kill it. But on first glance he can see it is a lie, and a set-up — a practical joke by Hlavin, to wipe out Supaari's new family line before it can begin. Remembering Anne, the doctor of the human landing party who became his friend, he names his little girl Ha'anala, "like Anne". Taking her, he leaves behind everything and goes to his family. There, he recognizes that he has no place among the Jana'ata.

The Runa of Kashan village, where the revolution began, offer to keep him safe as a hasta'akala (total dependent). He has worked with them for decades, selling their merchandise in the city of Gayjur. By law, a hasta'akala patron must provide all his food. The Runa have been bred for many centuries as not only servants but food for the Jana'ata; but the vaKashani love Supaari to the point of volunteering to die for him and the child to eat (reflecting Jesus' Eucharistic sacrifice, the most important sacrament in Catholicism). Supaari refuses their kind offer. Instead he takes Ha'anala to where Sofia is and becomes a spy, aiding in the extermination of his own species. Ha'anala is a brilliant, inquisitive little girl whom Sofia educates as she would any Jewish child. One day, Isaac leaves. Ha'anala finds him, but she recognizes that he will not go back, so she accompanies him. They stumble upon a group of Jana'ata people in the N'Jarr Valley in the mountains and stay with them. Ha'anala later marries Shetri Laaks, one of these people, and has many children, although several of them die due to malnutrition; Ha'anala refuses to eat Runa.

Hlavin Kitheri, inspired partly by his encounter with Sandoz, begins to revolutionize Jana'ata society by abolishing the stultifying hierarchies, even establishing a sort of democracy. He seizes the Paramountcy, the highest office in Inbrokar, by killing his entire family and framing Supaari for the murders. One of his first steps is to educate all the women. He hears of an extraordinary Jana'ata female, Suukmel. She advises him; he wants her, but she refuses to give him more than the chance to foster a child, Rukuei, with her. 
 
In the terrible war that follows, Hlavin fights Supaari in hand-to-hand combat, without armor. Both die in the prelude to the epic loss of Inbrokar to the Runa. Suukmel departs with Rukuei and finds the N'Jarr Valley. There Jana'ata and Runa work together, trying to build a new culture based on individual choice. The Jana'ata there believe they must find food other than Runa, but many are starving. There are game animals they could hunt, but they run the risk of being captured and killed by the Runa.

Emilio Sandoz returns to Rakhat aboard the Giordano Bruno to find that the Runa have killed nearly all the Jana'ata and taken control of the planet for themselves. The Jesuits expected they would have to assist the Runa in their war for independence, but the Runa have won independently.

Sofia talks to Emilio. The N'Jarr Valley is found, and Sofia sends Runa troops there, convinced that Ha'anala is keeping Isaac, now 40, captive. Isaac is staying there by his own choice, continuing a long-term project on his mother's old computer tablet. Ha'anala dies in childbirth, but Sandoz saves the baby. The Jesuit Danny Iron Horse, a Lakota, works with Suukmel to arrange an Indian reservation-like setup for the remaining Jana'ata on Rakhat.

In the end, Emilio and the Mafiosi return to Earth on the Giordano Bruno, bringing with them Rukuei Kitheri, a poet. Sofia dies, and Suukmel stays in the N'Jarr Valley with Ha'anala's children and Isaac, who thinks he has found proof of the existence of God in patterns of music created by overlapping the genomes of all three sentient species (this has been his mysterious lifelong project).

Sandoz comes home. Time has passed — Gina is dead. At her grave, he is greeted by a lady who reveals herself as Gina's second daughter as well as his own daughter.

Literary significance and reception 

A reviewer from the Library Journal said that Children of God "examines the problem of faith under fire with insight and clarity". A Publishers Weekly review determined Russell "uses the entertaining plot to explore sociological, spiritual, and scientific questions. Misunderstandings between cultures and peoples are at the heart of her story".

Reviewing the novel in National Catholic Reporter, novelist Valerie Sayers felt that Children of God focuses on the problem of evil. She was critical of the author's tone but praised her prose style. "The steady rate of shouting and imploring is rough indicator of the melodrama level. The minor characters tend to the stereotype." Finally, she said, "Russell's keen intelligence and scientific knowledge shine through often enough to make Children of God appealing often enough to make me wish she had dispensed with the least satisfying conventions of the genre".

Awards and nominations 
 The Sparrow and Children of God together won the 2001 Gaylactic Spectrum Hall of Fame.
 Nominee for the 1999 Hugo Award
 On the Long List for the 1999 James Tiptree Jr. Award
 Nominee for the 2000 British Science Fiction Association Awards

Publication history 

 1998, USA, Villard , Pub Date 24 March 1998, Hardcover
 1999, USA, Ballantine Books, Pub Date 2 February 1999, Paperback
 1999, UK, Black Swan, Pub Date Feb 1999, Paperback

Sources, references, external links, quotations 

 Infinity Plus Interview with Mary Doria Russell where she discusses Children of God.
 Mary Doria Russell personal website.

Notes 

1998 American novels
1998 science fiction novels
American science fiction novels
Catholic novels
Sequel novels
Villard (imprint) books
Alpha Centauri in fiction
Novels set on fictional planets
Religion in science fiction